China Medical University (CMU) is a public medical university in Shenyang, Liaoning, China. The university was the first medical school established by the Chinese Communist Party. The predecessor of the university was the Military Medical School of the Chinese Workers' and Peasants' Red Army founded in Ruijin, Jiangxi Province in November 1931.

At present, China Medical University is accredited to grant doctoral degrees in 6 primary disciplines, which are Basic Medicine, Clinical Medicine, Biology, Stomatology, Public Health and Preventive Medicine, and Nursing. It also has five national key academic disciplines and one national key academic discipline in cultivation, 40 national key clinical specialty construction projects of National Health Commission, 6 first class distinctive disciplines of universities and colleges in Liaoning, 7 mobile post-doctoral stations and 21 undergraduate specialties.

History
The China Medical University (CMU) was the first medical school established by the Chinese Communist Party. Its precursor was the Chinese Workers’-Peasants’ Red Army Military Medical School and Chinese Workers’-Peasants’ Red Army Health School which had been founded in Ruijin, Jiangxi in 1931. After the Long March with the Red Army, it was relocated to Shanbei.

In 1940 comrade Mao Zedong proposed, and the central committee of the Chinese Communist Party approved, the name of the school being changed to China Medical University. In July 1946 the university was ordered to enter northeast China with the army and reached Xinshan city (now Hegang city), Heilongjiang province. In November 1948 the whole northeast of China was liberated and the university was ordered to move to Shenyang. In 1948 and 1949 it absorbed the medical school formerly operated by the (Japanese) South Manchuria Railway (the South Manchuria Medical College, later called the Shenyang Medical College which had opened in 1911) and the Mukden Medical College (sometimes spelled Moukden Medical College) whose origins go back to 1892 when Dr Dugald Christie founded the Shenjing Medical School. In 1911/1912 this became a formal medical college, the Mukden Medical College.

Department structure 
College of Basic Medical Sciences
The First Clinical College and The First Affiliated Hospital
The Second Clinical College and The Second Affiliated Hospital (Sheng Jing Hospital)
The Third Clinical College and The Third Affiliated Hospital (merged with Sheng Jing Hospital)
The Fourth Clinical College and Fourth Affiliated Hospital
School of Stomatology and Affiliated Stomatological Hospital
College of Public Health
Faculty of Forensic Medicine
College of Nursing

Rankings and Reputation
The MBBS program at China Medical University has been taught in the English language since 1978. On U.S. News & World Report Best Global University Ranking by subject Clinical Medicine, it is ranked #345 in the world, #55 in Asia and #10 in China.
 It ranks among the top medical universities in China, according to CWTS Leiden Ranking 2018 and Chinese university ranking (CUAA) 2018. It is also approved by the Chinese Ministry of Education to recruit international students for its English-medium programs. On World Health Organization's World Directory of Medical Schools, the MBBS program is listed as taught in Chinese, Japanese and English. CMU has three large and modern affiliated hospitals, where students can do internship in the final year. Sheng Jing Hospital is famous for gynecology and obstetrics.

See also
Education in the People's Republic of China
List of universities in China

References

External links 
 

 
Universities in China with English-medium medical schools
Universities and colleges in Liaoning
Universities and colleges in Shenyang
Medical schools in China
Educational institutions established in 1931
1931 establishments in China